Zhou Yimiao, also spelled as Zhou Yi-Miao, (born February 7, 1991) is a professional Chinese tennis player.

Zhou was born in Hubei.  Her highest WTA singles ranking is 127, which she reached on August 19, 2013. Her career high in doubles is 134, which she reached on September 16, 2013.

She has won 6 singles and 8 doubles ITF titles .

ITF finals (14–10)

Singles (6–3)

Doubles (8–7)

External links

1991 births
Living people
Chinese female tennis players
Tennis players from Hubei
21st-century Chinese women